Ithaca was an electoral district of the Legislative Assembly in the Australian state of Queensland from 1912 to 1986.

It mostly covered the inner northwest suburbs of Brisbane, including Red Hill and Paddington. It was named after the Ithaca Creek.

Ithaca was at first a safe Labor seat, but was won and retained for the rest of its existence by the Liberal party in the 1960 election. It was the seat of Premier Ned Hanlon from 1926 until his death in 1952.

Ithaca was abolished in the redistribution before the 1986 election, and its area mostly taken up by the district of Mount Coot-tha.

Members for Ithaca

Election results

See also
 Electoral districts of Queensland
 Members of the Queensland Legislative Assembly by year
 :Category:Members of the Queensland Legislative Assembly by name

References

Former electoral districts of Queensland
Constituencies established in 1912
Constituencies disestablished in 1986
1912 establishments in Australia
1986 disestablishments in Australia